Lebiya (Lebiye) is a rural locality (a selo) in Bakhsytsky Rural Okrug of Churapchinsky District in the Sakha Republic, Russia, located  from Churapcha, the administrative center of the district, and  from Tolon, the administrative center of the rural okrug. It had no population as of the 2010 Census; in the 2002 Census, the recorded population was 3.

References

Notes

Sources
Official website of the Sakha Republic. Registry of the Administrative-Territorial Divisions of the Sakha Republic. Churapchinsky District. 

Rural localities in Churapchinsky District